Sliced is a British television sitcom which began airing on 15 May 2019. It was created and written by Phil Bowker and Samson Kayo for broadcast on Dave. The show follows two friends and fellow pizza delivery drivers Joshua and Ricky in south London, who just want to make some money, move out of their family homes and meet some women. The series stars David Mumeni, Phil Daniels, Kayo and Nahel Tzegai. In January 2020, it was renewed for a 6-episode second series, to premiere later in the year. Series 2 premiered on 3 June 2021.

Cast
 Samson Kayo as Joshua
 Theo Barklem-Biggs as Ricky
 Weruche Opia as Naomi
 David Mumeni as Mario
 Phil Daniels as Scott
 Danielle Vitalis as Teeka (Series 1)
 Racheal Ofori as Teeka (Series 2)

Episodes

Series 1 (2019)

Series 2 (2021)

References

External links
 
 

2019 British television series debuts
2010s British sitcoms
2010s British workplace comedy television series
2020s British sitcoms
2020s British workplace comedy television series
Dave (TV channel) original programming
English-language television shows